Alexandra Dindiligan (born 16 February 1997) is a Romanian handball player who plays as a left wing for CSM București and the Romanian national team.

She represented Romania at the 2020 European Women's Handball Championship.

International honours 
Youth World Championship:
Gold Medalist: 2014
Junior World Championship:
Bronze Medalist: 2016

References

1997 births
Living people
Sportspeople from Galați
Romanian female handball players